Utti Air Base  is a military airport located in Utti, Kouvola, Finland,  east of Kouvola city centre. The helicopter battalion of the Utti Jaeger Regiment is based here.

Statistics

See also 
List of the largest airports in the Nordic countries

References

External links 
 
 AIP Finland – Utti Airport
 

Airports in Finland
Kouvola
Finnish Air Force bases
Buildings and structures in Kymenlaakso